Örvar Þóreyjarson Smárason (born 1977) is a founding member of Icelandic experimental band múm, and has been a part-time member of other Icelandic bands such as Benni Hemm Hemm, Singapore Sling, Slowblow, Andhéri, Skakkamanage, FM Belfast and Represensitive Man.

In Iceland, Örvar is also known as a poet and author. Gamall þrjótur, nýjir tímar ("Old villain, new times") a book of poetry was published in 2005 as a part of Nýhil's Nordic literature series. It was preceded by the critically acclaimed novella Úfin, strokin ("Ruffled, stroked"), released in 2005 and described as "a detective boy novel updated for modern girls". He studied screenwriting at FAMU in Prague.

Publications and discography

 Úfin, strokin ("Ruffled, stroked") (2005) – novella
 Scapigliata, lisciata (Italian translation of Úfin, Strokin) (Scritturapura, Italy, 2008) – novella
 Gamall þrjótur, nýjir tímar ("Old villain, new times") (Nýhil, 2005) – poetry
 To Fruits Turn the Youth (Afterhours, Japan, 2007) – Illustrations, drawings and poetry
 Team Dreams (Morr Music, 2017) collaborative album of Sin Fang, Sóley and Örvar Smárason 
 Light is Liquid (Morr Music, 2018) first solo album

References 

1977 births
Living people
Academy of Performing Arts in Prague alumni
Orvar Thoreyjarson Smarason
Orvar Thoreyjarson Smarason
Orvar Thoreyjarson Smarason